The Hammond Bridge is a historic structure located west of Hamilton, Iowa, United States. Samuel B. Hammond, for whom the bridge is named, requested the Marion County Board of Supervisors in January 1894 to build a bridge near his property. In April of that year they examined the site, and in June they contracted with S.F. Collins to build the Howe covered through truss. He completed it later that year. The stream has been channelized so the truss no longer spans the main water flow. In October 1977 a  truck accident closed the bridge for two years, and it reopened in September 1979. The bridge was listed on the National Register of Historic Places in 1998. While it remains in place, a newer span was built to carry the vehicle traffic over the creek.

References

Bridges completed in 1894
Bridges in Marion County, Iowa
National Register of Historic Places in Marion County, Iowa
Covered bridges on the National Register of Historic Places in Iowa
Wooden bridges in Iowa
Howe truss bridges in the United States
Road bridges in Iowa